Fight for the Rock is the third studio album by the American heavy metal band Savatage, released on June 30, 1986. It is their first album with new bass player Johnny Lee Middleton.

Released in 1986, it is largely regarded as the band's worst release by both fans and band members, with the band referring to it as "Fight for the Nightmare". Jon Oliva said in October 1994, "I've never really been fond of that album. WE'VE never been fond of that album". The band said that they were driven to make the record by their label, Atlantic Records; particularly Oliva began writing pop-rock songs for other artists on the label such as John Waite. However, the label eventually turned around and told the band to record the music that Oliva had written for other artists themselves. This destroyed the band's credibility in the eyes of the press and reviews were not kind to the band. It not only destroyed the band's image, but the negative critical reaction has been cited as a cause of Oliva's bout of drug and alcohol depression which eventually drove him from the fore of the band.

Atlantic Records also wanted the band to have photographs taken, since none of their previous releases had included any. The band hired a friend to do the photography work, with one of the photos featuring the band re-recreating the famous photo Raising the Flag on Iwo Jima. The band agreed this was a good idea at the time, but look back with the same feelings on the photos taken as they do the album.

When initially released, the album featured a Parental Advisory label on the front cover, despite having no "nasty words", as Jon Oliva puts it, featured anywhere on the record. This was largely done to please the label, as they felt that putting the sticker on the record would drive up record sales. Although it did chart, the band have been extremely reluctant to perform any of the songs live, and haven't done so since the early 1990s. Even on the tour in support of the album, the band only performed "Hyde", "The Edge of Midnight" and few others.

Track listing

Personnel
Savatage
Jon Oliva – lead vocals, piano
Criss Oliva – guitars, backing vocals
Johnny Lee Middleton – bass guitar, backing vocals
Steve "Doc" Wacholz – drums, percussion

Additional musicians
Larry Dvoskin (credited as "Dvoskin") – keyboards
Brent Daniels – backing vocals

Production
Stephan Galfas – producer, engineer, mixing
Mario Rodriguez, Ralph Mastrangelo – assistant mixing
Mark Jolley – engineer
Dan McMillan – assistant engineer
Bob Ludwig – mastering at Masterdisk, New York
Robert Zemsky – associate producer, management 
Steven Machat, Rick Smith – executive producers
Bob Defrin – art direction

Charts

References

1986 albums
Atlantic Records albums
Savatage albums